Tomosvaryella subvirescens is a species of big-headed flies, insects in the family Pipunculidae.

Distribution
United States. Canada, Bermuda, Palaearctic.

References

Pipunculidae
Insects described in 1872
Diptera of Europe
Diptera of North America
Taxa named by Hermann Loew